Vostochniye skazki is the sixth studio album by Blestyashchiye.

Track listing

"Vostochniye skazki" (Eastern fairytales) (duet with Arash)
"Palmy parami" (Palms with couples)
"Agent 007" (-)
"Hey, allo au" (-)
"Kak zvezda" (Like a star)
"Poverila" (I believed)
"Kapitan dalnego plavaniya"
"Operupolnomochenniy"
"Naleteli vdrug dozhdi"
"Brat moy desantnik"
"Novogodnyaya pesnya" (New Year song)
"Vengerovv & Fedoroff with Blestyashchiye" (poppuri)
"Novogodnyaya pesnya" (remix)
"Apel'sinovaya pesnya" (remix)

Vocals
Kseniya Novikova
Yulia Kovalchuk
Anna Semenovich
Nadezhda Ruchka

External links
 Official Website

Blestyashchiye albums
2006 albums